Fabes con almejas (English: Beans with claims, Spanish: Habas con almejas, Asturian: Fabes con amasueles) is a clam and bean stew that originated in the principality of Asturias in the 19th century as peasant fare. It is a lighter variation of Asturian fabada whose primary ingredients are sausage, beans and pork.

The traditional recipe for fabes con almejas calls for small clams, fava beans, onions, garlic, salt, saffron, bay leaves, olive oil, parsley, bread crumbs and sometimes sweet paprika.

See also
 List of clam dishes
 List of fish and seafood soups
 List of seafood dishes

References

External links
  Fabes con Almejas recipe Take a taste of Asturias

Asturian cuisine
Spanish soups and stews
Legume dishes
Clam dishes